Stompen Ground Festival is a contemporary and traditional music, dance, art exhibitions and ancestral storytelling festival in Broome, in the Kimberley region of Western Australia. Stompend is an Aboriginal and Torres Strait Islander owned, designed and managed arts and cultural festival.

It includes:
Music development workshops
Battle of the bands
Country music night
Dance forums & traditional dance presentations
Book launches

See also

Garma Festival of Traditional Cultures
Indigenous Australian music
Survival Festival

External links
Stompen Ground (1991 documentary) at the Internet Movie Database

Indigenous Australian music
Music festivals in Australia
Organisations serving Indigenous Australians
Indigenous music festivals